Sved or SVED may refer to:

Márta Svéd (died 2005), Hungarian–Australian mathematician
Peter Sved, Australian filmmaker, director of Crawlspace (2004 film)
SVED, the ICAO airport code for El Dorado Airport (Venezuela)